Beryl Cyril Sheldon Jr. (November 30, 1931 – December 27, 2019), known professionally as Jack Sheldon, was an American singer, musician, and actor. He performed on The Merv Griffin Show and participated in episodes of the educational music television series Schoolhouse Rock!, where he became known for his distinctive voice.

Biography

Music and TV
Sheldon was born in Jacksonville, Florida, United States. He originally became known through his participation in the West Coast jazz movement of the 1950s, performing and recording with such figures as Stan Kenton, Art Pepper, Gerry Mulligan, and Curtis Counce.  Sheldon played the trumpet, sang, and performed on The Merv Griffin Show. He was Griffin's sidekick for many years. Prior to joining Griffin's show, he served as bandleader for the short-lived The Las Vegas Show.

His voice is perhaps best known from the Schoolhouse Rock! cartoons of the 1970s, such as "Conjunction Junction" and "I'm Just a Bill". He appeared in two episodes of Johnny Bravo as the Sensitive Man. He sang a few songs in the episodes similar to the Schoolhouse Rock! style. Sheldon returned to the Schoolhouse Rock! series for a 2002 episode titled "I'm Gonna Send Your Vote to College", explaining the electoral college process, distributed on the series' DVD collection that same year. Sheldon sang and played trumpet for the new segment.

Sheldon voiced "Louie the Lightning Bug" in a series of animated musical public service announcements (animated by legend Bob Kurtz from his Kurtz & Friends studio) aimed at children across the United States and Canada, beginning in May 1984, promoting safety with electricity. In 2001, the "Louie the Lightning Bug" videos were updated with new voice-overs by Sheldon and new music tracks produced by Mark Harrelson, with updated musical arrangements by Ray Reach.

He sang the tune "King Putt" for The World According to Goofy Parade at Disneyland, which ran for five months in 1992. A trumpet solo of his is featured throughout the Francis Ford Coppola film One from the Heart (1982). Tom Waits' 1977 album Foreign Affairs includes Sheldon playing trumpet on several cuts, including the solo at the end of "Burma Shave".

Sheldon starred with Cara Williams and Frank Aletter on the CBS situation comedy The Cara Williams Show in 1964–1965. From 1966–1967, Sheldon starred in his own 16-episode CBS sitcom, Run, Buddy, Run, as Buddy Overstreet, a young accountant taking a steam bath who, overhearing a mobster's plot to kill a colleague, then goes on the run to keep from being killed. Bruce Gordon, formerly of The Untouchables, played the mobster, "Mr. D". Sheldon made numerous appearances on the 1967–1970 version of Dragnet. He also played John Davidson's brother (and Sally Field's brother-in-law) on The Girl with Something Extra (1974). In 2004, he performed live at the end of ALF's Hit Talk Show.

Film
Sheldon appeared in an Oscar-nominated documentary film Let's Get Lost about the life of fellow jazz trumpeter Chet Baker. He made an appearance in the 1994 film Radioland Murders as the ill-fated trumpet player Ruffles Reedy, who becomes a victim of the gruesome goings-on during a 1939 radio show.

Jack's poignant trumpet solo on "The Shadow of Your Smile" which was introduced in the 1965 film The Sandpiper helped earn it Song of the Year at the 1966 Grammy Awards and Best Original Song at the 1965 Academy Awards.

Sheldon performed one of the many versions of the title song featured in Robert Altman's 1973 film The Long Goodbye. His version was intended to be released as a single, but never was.

Sheldon is the subject of a documentary, Trying to Get Good: the Jazz Odyssey of Jack Sheldon (2008). Produced by Doug McIntyre and Penny Peyser, the film features interviews with Clint Eastwood, Billy Crystal, Merv Griffin, Chris Botti, Dave Frishberg, Johnny Mandel, Tierney Sutton, as well as never before seen concert footage of Sheldon playing, singing and joking. Trying to Get Good won Jury Prizes at the 2008 Kansas City Film Makers Jubilee and Newport Beach Film Festival, as well as Audience Prizes at Newport Beach and the Indianapolis International Film Festival.

Parody
Sheldon parodied his own performance in "I'm Just a Bill" in an episode of The Simpsons called "The Day the Violence Died", where he is an "amendment to be". He reprised his roles as the Bill and the Conductor from "Conjunction Junction" in two episodes of Family Guy.

Death
Sheldon died of natural causes on December 27, 2019, at the age of 88.

Discography

As leader
 Jack Sheldon Quintet (Jazz: West, 1955)
 The Quartet and the Quintet (Jazz: West, 1956)
 A Jazz Band Ball with Stu Williamson (Mode, 1959)
 A Jazz Profile of Ray Charles (Reprise, 1961)
 Jack's Groove (GNP, 1961)
 Out! (Capitol, 1962)
 Oooo, But it's Good (Capitol, 1963)
 The Warm World of Jack Sheldon (Dot, 1968)
 The Cool World of Jack Sheldon (Dot, 1969)
 Singular (Beez, 1980)
 Playin' It Straight (RealTime, 1981)
 Stand By for Jack Sheldon (Concord Jazz, 1983)
 Hollywood Heroes (Concord Jazz, 1988)
 On My Own (Concord Jazz, 1992)
 Jack Sheldon Sings (Butterfly, 1993)
 Jack Sheldon Presents The Entertainers (V.S.O.P., 1994)
 Jack is Back! (Butterfly, 1995)
 Live at Don Mupo's Gold Nugget (V.S.O.P., 1997)
 Playing for Change (Uptown, 1997)
 JSO Live! On the Pacific Ocean (Butterfly, 2001)
 Sunday Afternoons at the Lighthouse (Woofy, 2005)
 Listen Up (Butterfly, 2006)
 It's What I Do (Butterfly, 2007)

As guest
With Curtis Counce
 The Curtis Counce Group (Contemporary, 1956)
 You Get More Bounce with Curtis Counce! (Contemporary, 1957)
 Carl's Blues (Contemporary, 1957)
 Sonority (Contemporary, 1957–8 [1989])

With Jimmy Giuffre
 Jimmy Giuffre (Capitol, 1955)
 Tangents in Jazz (Capitol, 1956)
 The Jimmy Giuffre Clarinet (Atlantic, 1956)

With Stan Kenton
 The Stage Door Swings (Capitol, 1958)
 Kenton Live from the Las Vegas Tropicana (Capitol, 1959 [1961])
 Hair (Capitol, 1969)

With Tom Waits
 Foreign Affairs (Asylum, 1977)
 One from the Heart (Columbia, 1982)

With others
 Johnny Mandel, I Want to Live (United Artists, 1958)
 Herbie Mann, Great Ideas of Western Mann (Riverside, 1957)
 Shelly Manne, My Fair Lady with the Un-original Cast (Capitol, 1964)
 Johnny Mandel "The Sandpiper" Musical score and soundtrack  (Filmways, Mercury Records, 1965)
 The Monkees, The Birds, the Bees & the Monkees (Colgems, 1968)
 Frank Morgan, Frank Morgan (Gene Norman Presents, 1955)
 Anita O'Day, Cool Heat (Verve, 1959)
 Art Pepper, The Return of Art Pepper (Jazz: West, 1956)
 Art Pepper, Smack Up (Contemporary, 1960)
 André Previn, The Subterraneans (Soundtrack) (MGM, 1960)
 Pete Rugolo, Behind Brigitte Bardot (Warner Bros., 1960)
 Sonny Stitt, Sonny Stitt Plays Jimmy Giuffre Arrangements (Verve, 1959)
Lena Horne, Lena...Lovely and Alive (RCA, 1962)

Filmography
 1962 : Music of the 60's : 3rd trumpet and featured soloist on several tunes
 1965: "The Sandpiper" Music by Johnny Mandel:  featured trumpet soloist
 1966-1967 : Run, Buddy, Run (TV) : Buddy Overstreet (series star - all 13 episodes)
 1967 : Dragnet (TV) : Various Characters (unknown episodes)
 1969 : Under the Yum Yum Tree (TV) : Charlie Prokter
 1969-1970 : Petticoat Junction  (TV) : Freddie Kirby, Ronald "Ronnie" Coleman (episodes: The Organ Fund, Selma Plout's Plot)
 1973-2009 : Schoolhouse Rock! (TV series) : Conductor/The Bill/Additional Voices (voice)
 1973-1974 : The Girl with Something Extra (TV series) : Jerry Burton (12 episodes)
 1973 : The Long Goodbye (film) : Vocals, probably trumpet on title song 
 1976 : Freaky Friday : Lloyd
 1984 : Cassevetes Love Streams: Almost in Love with You : Vocal and Trumpet 
 1988 : Star Trek: The Next Generation (TV) : Holodeck Pianist (11001001)
 1988 : Let's Get Lost : Himself
 1991 : For the Boys : Wally Fields
 1993 : Lush Life (TV) : Norman
 1994 : Radioland Murders : Ruffles Reed
 1996 : Dear God : Homeless Trumpeter
 1996 : The Simpsons (TV series) : The Amendment (voice) (episode: The Day the Violence Died)
 1997 : Johnny Bravo (TV series) (voice)
 1998 : Hard Time (TV) : Trumpet
 1998 : Mike Hammer (TV) episode(s) "Songbird" parts 1-2 Co-starred w/Keach as "Des" Bandleader/Trumpet player/ Singer.
 1999 : Hard Time: The Premonition (TV) : Trumpet
 1999 : Hard Time: Hostage Hotel (TV) : Trumpet
 2000-2001 : Family Guy (TV series) : Conductor/The Bill (voice) (episodes: Running Mates, Mr. Griffin Goes to Washington)
 2004 : Teacher's Pet : Vocals on Song- "Take the Money and Run"
 2010 : A Girl's Life: Ford Mosquito (voice)

References

External links

 
 
 

1931 births
2019 deaths
American male singers
American jazz singers
American male television actors
American male voice actors
Bebop singers
Bebop trumpeters
Burials in Orange County, California
Musicians from Jacksonville, Florida
West Coast jazz singers
West Coast jazz trumpeters
Male actors from Jacksonville, Florida
21st-century trumpeters
21st-century American male musicians
American male jazz musicians